The Belarusian Cup is an annual association football knock-out cup competition for men's football clubs in Belarus. The tournament is organized by the Football Federation of Belarus.

Belarusian Cup was established in 1992. Each year the winning team qualifies for the UEFA Europa League.

History and format
The cup is a traditional single-elimination tournament. Usually, the cup involves all clubs participating in Belarusian Premier League, First League and Second League, as well a small number of amateur clubs that can qualify through local amateur Cup competitions. Unlike the league season, Belarusian Cup is still played using a fall/spring schedule (while the League has switched to spring/fall schedule in 1995). 

The most frequently used format of the cup included six rounds. Typically, the quarterfinals and semifinals are played after the winter break and consist of two-legged ties. However, both the schedule and the number of matches in each round can be adjusted depending on the availability of domestic match dates. The final match is traditionally played in May.  Since 2013, the final is played at various venues across the country.

Finals

Soviet time winners
Finals before independence were:

1936 Dinamo (Minsk)                     3-1 Spartak (Minsk)
1939  Minsk                          6-1 Spartak (Bobruysk)
1940 Dinamo (Minsk)                     1-0  (Minsk)
1945  (Minsk)    1-0 Dinamo II (Minsk)
1946  (Minsk)    4-0 KVT Brest
1947 Torpedo (Minsk)                    8-0 Dinamo (Beranovichi)
1948 Sbornoya Borisova (Borisov)        3-0 Dinamo (Brest)
1949  (Bobruysk) 2-0 Torpedo (Minsk)
1950  (Minsk)    2-1 Torpedo (Minsk)
1951  (Minsk)    9-1 Spartak (Bobruysk)
1952 Spartak (Minsk)                    3-0  (Minsk)
1953 Spartak (Minsk)                   10-0 Stroitel (Mozyr)
1954 Torpedo (Vitebsk)                  4-1 KMO Minsk
1955 Burevestnik (Minsk)                4-1 KMO Minsk
1956 Minsk Rayona                       3-0 Mogilev Rayona
1957 Sputnik (Minsk)                    4-1 Komanda Molototskogo Rayona
1958  Minsk                          1-1 (1-0 replay) Sbornaya Borisova
1959 Plant Voroshilova (Minsk)          6-2 Borisov Rayona
1960 Sputnik (Minsk)                    0-0 (3-2 replay) Traktor (Minsk)
1961 Sputnik (Minsk)                    3-2 Traktor (Minsk)
1962 Torpedo (Minsk)                    1-0 Sputnik (Minsk)
1963 Sputnik (Minsk)                    1-0 Spartak (Minsk)
1964 Gvardeyets (Minsk)                 3-1 Narocha (Molodechno)
1965 Neftianik (Novopolotsk)            1-0 Lokomotiv (Brest)
1966 Sputnik (Minsk)                    2-0 Mebelschik (Bobruysk)

1967 Sputnik (Minsk)                    1-0 Torpedo (Minsk)
1968 Torpedo (Minsk)                    2-1 Spartak (Minsk)
1969 Torpedo (Zhodino)                  3-1 Universitet (Gomel)
1970 Sputnik (Minsk)                    1-1 (2-0 replay) Torpedo (Zhodino)
1971 Torpedo (Zhodino)              4-0 2-1 Start (Orsha)
1972 Torpedo (Zhodino)                  2-0 Obuvschik (Lida)
1973 Orbita (Minsk)                     2-0 Stroitel (Bobruysk)
1974 Stroitel (Bobruysk)                1-0 Orbita (Minsk)
1975 Stroitel (Bobruysk)                1-0 Temp (Orsha)
1976 Bate (Borisov)                     2-0 Burevestnik (Minsk)
1977 Torpedo (Zhodino)                  3-1 Shinnik (Bobruysk)
1978 Torpedo (Zhodino)                  2-1 Burevestnik (Minsk)
1979 Shinnik (Bobruysk)                 3-1 Pedinstitut (Brest)
1980 Burevestnik (Minsk)                3-1 Shinnik (Bobruysk)
1981 Torpedo (Zhodino)                  4-4 Impuls (Grodno)        [aet, 5-4 pen]
1982 Torpedo (Zhodino)                  3-0 Obuvschik (Lida)
1983 Torpedo (Zhodino)                  1-0 Impuls (Gomel)
1984 Orbita (Minsk)                     2-0 Torpedo (Zhodino)
1985 Shakhtyor (Soligorsk)              3-1 Olimp (Grodno)
1986 Shakhtyor (Soligorsk)              3-0 Sputnik (Minsk)
1987 SKIF Minsk                         1-1 Temp (Orsha)           [aet, 4-2 pen]
1988 Shakhtyor (Soligorsk)              0-0 Sputnik (Minsk)        [aet, 4-3 pen]
1989 Sputnik (Minsk)                    8-2 Pedinstitut (Brest)
1990 Metallurg (Molodechno)             2-1 SKIF- Minsk       [aet]
1991 Metallurg (Molodechno)             2-0 Shinnik (Bobruysk)

Performance by club
Performance since independence.

References

External links
Cup at UEFA
Belarus - List of Cup Finals, RSSSF.com

 
1
Belarus